Hans Tirusson (1884 Tarvastu Parish (now Viljandi Parish), Kreis Fellin - ?) was an Estonian politician. He was a member of II Riigikogu. He was a member of the Riigikogu since 29 February 1924. He replaced Harald-Paul Keerdo. On 22 March 1924, he resigned his position and he was replaced by Peeter Palovere.

References

1884 births
Year of death missing
People from Viljandi Parish
People from Kreis Fellin
Workers' United Front politicians
Members of the Riigikogu, 1923–1926